The history of beer in Hong Kong dates back to the mid-19th century. Currently the best selling beer is San Miguel, brewed by San Miguel Brewery Hong Kong. San Miguel had been brewed in Sham Tseng since 1948 and later moved to Yuen Long until 2007. The brewery was reopened in 2009.

Carlsberg was also brewed in Tai Po since the 1980s until recently. Blue Girl Beer, a brand owned by the Hong Kong-based trading and distribution company Jebsen & Co.,  is brewed in South Korea under supervision of Jebsen & Co.

Other notable brands include Tsingtao and Corona. Jolly Shandy is also fairly popular among women and youngsters.

International craft beer and microbrews have seen a rise in popularity since 2010, with specialty and premium beer from countries such as Belgium, the UK, Australia, the US and Japan being more widely available. This has led to the formation of the Craft Beer Association of Hong Kong, made up of distributors, consumers, retailers, bars & restaurants.

Local Breweries
'Hong Kong Beer Co' was started in 1995, though it was originally known as South China Brewing Company. It is the oldest existing local craft brewery. Typhoon Brewery was in business from 2009 to 2014 on Lantau Island. Due to changes in alcohol licensing legislation implemented in the year 2000, brewing beer at home using small scale equipment and ingredients, commonly referred to as "home brewing", is now permissible in Hong Kong within limits.

Gallery

See also 

 Beer and breweries by region
 Lan Kwai Fong
 Oktoberfest Hong Kong

References

External links
 http://intransit.blogs.nytimes.com/2009/06/01/locally-brewed-beer-in-hong-kong/
 Beertopia beer festival
 Craft Beer Association of Hong Kong
 Bestbev HK Ltd.
 Complete List of HK Breweries

 
Hong Kong-related lists
Hong Kong cuisine
Hong Kong alcoholic drinks